Felice Cece (26 March 1936 – 12 May 2020) was an Italian Roman Catholic archbishop.

Cece was born in Italy and was ordained to the priesthood in 1959. He served as bishop of the Roman Catholic Diocese of Teano-Calvi, Italy, from 1984 to 1989 and as archbishop of the Roman Catholic Archdiocese of Sorrento-Castellammare di Stabia, Italy, from 1989 to 2010.

Notes

1936 births
2020 deaths
Italian Roman Catholic archbishops